Sebastiania subulata is a species of flowering plant in the family Euphorbiaceae. It was originally described as Excoecaria subulata Müll.Arg. in 1874. It is native to Paraguay.

References

Plants described in 1874
Flora of Paraguay
subulata